The effect of legalized abortion on crime (also the Donohue–Levitt hypothesis) is a controversial hypothesis about the reduction in crime in the decades following the legalization of abortion. Proponents argue that the availability of abortion resulted in fewer births of children at the highest risk of committing crime. The earliest research suggesting such an effect was a 1966 study in Sweden. In 2001, Steven Levitt of the University of Chicago and John Donohue of Yale University argued, citing their research and earlier studies, that children who are unwanted or whose parents cannot support them are likelier to become criminals. This idea was further popularized by its inclusion in the book Freakonomics, which Levitt co-wrote.

Critics have argued that Donohue and Levitt's methodologies are flawed and that no statistically significant relationship between abortion and later crime rates can be proven.  Criticisms include the assumption in the Donohue-Levitt study that abortion rates increased substantially since the 1973 Supreme Court case Roe v. Wade; critics use census data to show that the changes in the overall abortion rate could not account for the decrease in crime claimed by the study's methodology (legal abortions had been permitted under limited circumstances in many states prior). Other critics state that the correlations between births and crime found by Donohue–Levitt do not adequately account for confounding factors such as reduced drug use, changes in demographics and population densities, or other contemporary cultural changes.

1972 Rockefeller Commission 12.16

The 1972 Rockefeller Commission on "Population and the American Future" cites a 1966 study which found that children born to women who had been denied an abortion "turned out to have been registered more often with psychiatric services, engaged in more antisocial and criminal behavior, and have been more dependent on public assistance." In particular, the study looked at the children of 188 women who were denied abortions from 1939 to 1941 at the hospital in Gothenburg, Sweden. They compared these unwanted children to another group – the next child born after each of the unwanted children at the hospital. The unwanted children were more likely to grow up in adverse conditions, such as having divorced parents or being raised in foster homes and were more likely to become delinquents and engaged in crime.

2001 Donohue and Levitt study

Steven Levitt of the University of Chicago and John Donohue of Yale University revived discussion of this claim with their 2001 paper "The Impact of Legalized Abortion on Crime". Donohue and Levitt point to the fact that males aged 18 to 24 are most likely to commit crimes. Data indicates that crime in the United States started to decline in 1992. Donohue and Levitt suggest that the absence of unwanted children, following legalization in 1973, led to a reduction in crime 18 years later, starting in 1992 and dropping sharply in 1995. These would have been the peak crime-committing years of the unborn children.

According to Donohue and Levitt, states that had abortion legalized earlier should have the earliest reductions in crime. Donohue and Levitt's study indicates that this indeed has happened: Alaska, California, Hawaii, New York, Oregon and Washington experienced steeper drops in crime, and had legalized abortion before Roe v. Wade. Further, states with a high abortion rate have experienced a greater reduction in crime, when corrected for factors like average income. Finally, studies in Canada and Australia claim to have established a correlation between legalized abortion and overall crime reduction.

2001 criticism by Lott and Whitley
The study was criticized by various authors, including a 2001 article by John Lott and John Whitley, where they argued that Donohue and Levitt assume that states which completely legalized abortion had higher abortion rates than states where abortion was only legal under certain conditions (many states allowed abortion only under certain conditions prior to Roe) and that CDC statistics do not substantiate this claim. In addition, if abortion rates cause crime rates to fall, crime rates should start to fall among the youngest people first and then gradually be seen lowering the crime rate for older and older people. In fact, they argue, the murder rates first start to fall among the oldest criminals and then the next oldest criminals and so on until it last falls among the youngest individuals. Lott and Whitley argue that if Donohue and Levitt are right that 80 percent of the drop in murder rates during the 1990s is due solely to the legalization of abortion, their results should be seen in some graphs without anything being controlled for, and that in fact the opposite is true.  In addition, Lott and Whitley pointed out that using arrest rate data to proxy crime rates is flawed because arrest for murder can take place many months or even years after the crime occurred. Lott and Whitley claim that using the Supplemental Homicide Report, which links murder data for when the crime occurred with later arrest rate data, reverses Donohue and Levitt's regression results. In 2004, Ted Joyce published a study concluding that the negative association between legalized abortion and crime rates reported in Donohue and Levitt's study was actually due to unmeasured period effects from, among other factors, changes in crack cocaine use. In 2009, Joyce reported similar, negative results after analyzing age-specific homicide and murder arrest rates in relation to the legalization of abortion across U.S. states and cohorts.

In 2005 Levitt posted a rebuttal to these criticisms on the Freakonomics weblog, in which he re-ran his numbers to address the shortcomings and variables missing from the original study. The new results are nearly identical to those of the original study. Levitt posits that any reasonable use of the data available reinforces the results of the original 2001 paper.

2004 study by Donohue and Levitt
In 2004 a study by Donohue and Levitt was published in University of Wisconsin Press. They address criticism from a 2003 by Joyce study that showed no negative correlation between crime and legalized abortion during the crack epidemic in the late 1980s.  Donohue and Levitt show a negative still exists if the range of years examined were extended beyond those analyzed in the 2003 study, and the effects of the crack epidemic were adequately controlled.

2005 criticism by Foote and Goetz
Later in 2005, Christopher Foote and Christopher Goetz claimed that a computer error in Levitt and Donohue's statistical analysis led to an artificially inflated relationship between legalized abortion and crime reduction. Once other crime-associated factors were properly controlled for, they claimed that the effect of abortion on arrests was reduced by about half. Foote and Goetz also criticize Levitt and Donohue's use of arrest totals rather than arrests per capita, which takes population size into account. Using Census Bureau population estimates, Foote and Goetz repeated the analysis using arrest rates in place of simple arrest totals, and found that the effect of abortion disappeared entirely.

Donohue and Levitt subsequently published a response to the Foote and Goetz paper. The response acknowledged the mistake, but showed that with different methodology, the effect of legalized abortion on crime rates still existed. Foote and Goetz, however, soon produced a rebuttal of their own and showed that even after analyzing the data using the methods that Levitt and Donohue recommend, the data does not show a positive correlation between abortion rates and crime rates. They are quick to point out that this does not necessarily disprove Levitt's thesis, however, and emphasize that with data this messy and incomplete, it is in all likelihood not even possible to prove or disprove Donohue and Levitt's conclusion.

2007 Reyes leaded gasoline theory

A 2007 study by Jessica Reyes at Amherst College stated: "This implies that, between 1992 and 2002, the phase-out of lead from gasoline was responsible for approximately a 56% decline in violent crime. Sensitivity testing confirms the strength of these results. Results for murder are not robust if New York and the District of Columbia are included, but suggest a substantial elasticity as well. No significant effects are found for property crime. The effect of legalized abortion reported by Donohue and Levitt (2001) is largely unaffected, so that abortion accounts for a 29% decline in violent crime (elasticity 0.23), and similar declines in murder and property crime. Overall, the phase-out of lead and the legalization of abortion appear to have been responsible for significant reductions in violent crime rates."

2007 study by Kahane, Paton, and Simmons 
In 2007 a study by Leo H. Kahane, David Paton, Rob Simmons in Economica finds no clear, consistent relationship between abortion and crime in England and Wales.

2014 study by Buonanno, Drago, Galbiati, and Zanella 
In 2014 a study by Paolo Buonanno, Francesco Drago, Roberto Galbiati, and Giulio Zanella was published in Economic Policy and studies seven European nations and finds no evidence for the Donohue-Levitt hypothesis.

2014 study by Francois
In 2014 a study by Abel Francois was published in the International Review of Law and Economics which provides evidence on the subject through a panel data analysis of 16 countries in western Europe for 1990-2007. It finds that abortion caused a significant decrease in crime rates.

2017 study by Gary L. Shoesmith 
In 2017 a study by Gary L. Shoesmith was published in Crime & Delinquency concludes that "This study shows that, if there is a significant link between crime and abortion, it is due to varying concentrations of teenage abortions across states, not unwantedness."  In other words, the evidence presented by Shoesmith supports the conclusion that legalized abortion reduced crime in the 1990s as the Donohue-Levitt hypothesis indicated, but he argues this result is purely because it reduced the number of teenage mothers, not some broader effect of reducing all unwanted pregnancies.

2020 updated study by Donohue and Levitt
In 2020 a study by Donohue and Levitt was published in American Law and Economics Review to review the predictions of the original 2001 paper.

Overall the authors concluded that the predictions did hold up with strong effects. "We estimate that crime fell roughly 20% between 1997 and 2014 due to legalized abortion. The cumulative impact of legalized abortion on crime is roughly 45%, accounting for a very substantial portion of the roughly 50-55% overall decline from the peak of crime in the early 1990s."

Levitt discusses this paper and the background and history of the original paper (including its criticisms) in an episode of the Freakonomics podcast.

See also

 Lead–crime hypothesis
Freakonomics by Levitt and Stephen J. Dubner; Chapter 4 discusses this effect.
 Freedomnomics by John R. Lott Jr.; Chapter 4 discusses this effect.
 Statistical correlations of criminal behaviour
 Roe effect
 Title X
 Unintended pregnancy

References

Further reading
Barro, Robert J. "Does Abortion Lower the Crime Rate?" (Archive). BusinessWeek. September 27, 1999.

Abortion debate
Criminology